Edward M. Newman (1870–1953) was a film producer of many documentary film shorts released by Warner Brothers and edited at Vitaphone studios in Brooklyn, New York in the 1930s. These were mostly of the travelogue genre. He was born in Cleveland, Ohio on March 16, 1870. His parents were Hungarian immigrants.  He died in Los Angeles, California on April 16, 1953.

Overview
Around 1930, the major studios in Hollywood discovered that travel shorts running under 11 minutes were among the cheapest to produce as "filler" on the theatrical program. The number of "faraway adventures" made for eager Depression Era audiences, who seldom traveled far from home, rapidly increased at this time. (Films of this type had been around for decades.) Only one cameraman was needed, sometimes with a few assistants, along with one editor, sometimes a studio orchestra and usually a narrator. Much of the material could be shot silent and dubbed over later, although Fox Movietone News included on-location sound recordings with many of their "Magic Carpet" series.

Compared to the competition (which included Fox, Amadee J. Van Beuren "Vagabond Adventures" for RKO Pictures, Universal Pictures "Going Places", Columbia Pictures "Rambling Reporter", Educational Pictures "Treasure Chest" and other series and Metro-Goldwyn-Mayer Burton Holmes and James A. Fitzpatrick "Traveltalks"), the Warner-Newman travelogues were well-produced and often featured locales not covered in other series. One additional novelty was that the series name changed with each "season" (lasting September through August/September of the next year), spotlighting a specific theme such as U.S. history (as seen by famous sites) and "musical journeys". This enabled the theater exhibitors to offer attendees something different and new each year.

Ira Genet collaborated as director and writer with many of these. Key editor was Bert Frank, who also worked on many other Vitaphone shorts, including some documentaries that assembled old silent film footage. Leo Donnelly was a key narrator in the earlier shorts, also handling Ripley’s Believe It or Not for Warner-Vitaphone.

When rival FitzPatrick with MGM started shooting in full Technicolor, Warner was already spending a fortune on their other two-reel musical and comedy shorts in color. As a result of this (along with various technical difficulties), the Newman series continued to be released in black and white until 1936, then opted for the more economical Cinecolor. Trade reviews tended to unfavorably compare them with the MGM Traveltalks, which boasted the full rainbow effect. Yet they continued to be praised for their expert commentary and interesting subject matter. In 1938, the so-called "Colortours" were regrouped as the Vitaphone Color Parade, moving on to multi-subject topics backed by Mechanix Illustrated.

Earlier career
Prior to joining Warner-Vitaphone, E.M. Newman had roughly two decades of documentary film making experience. Unfortunately, like other pioneering "globe trotters", he was only fleetingly discussed in the periodicals of the times and is largely ignored by modern film historians. Like the more famous Burton Holmes, he was active on the travelogue lecture circuit (both with films and still photographs).

Educational Pictures, known today for its 1920s and '30s comedy films and as a distributor of animated cartoons more than its many documentaries, utilized him for a series of nature films and travelogues released in 1918, including some "scenics" of the Philippines, Japan and Mexico. Approximately thirty were produced. His interest in shooting wildlife with a camera never dimmed, since many of Warner's travelogues of the 1930s showcased such footage. (Examples include Animals of the Amazon and Slackers and Workers of the Jungle, while Berlin Today featured police dogs in training and Dear Old London covered the zoo in detail). In 1922, he tackled a 7,000 mile tour of Africa and, according to Film Daily, over 30,000 feet of footage (handled with just two assistants), including "two hundred different tribes of natives and all possible species of wild animals".

World War I saw him as a film correspondent and, according to Film Daily (August 21, 1918), "He has been with the American troops from their transports to the front. He was with them in Alsace, on the Piave and the Asiae-o Plateau. He witnessed the shelling of Paris and the raids on London. Mr. Newman's material includes all the work of the American forces, from the building of miles of railroads to the enormous bakeries. He still suffers from the effect of a gas attack, which laid him up for several weeks, and robbed him of his voice."

For the next 22 "seasons", he was on the lecture circuit and made a number of visits to the Brooklyn Institute of Arts and Sciences covering such locales as the Virgin Islands and, for his second travelogue presented at Carnegie Hall, a tour of Damascus and Syria. In 1924, he was working alongside Burton Holmes gathering material in Europe. A few months before releasing his first Warner travelogues, he had another successful Carnegie Hall presentation covering Italy with G. J. Marfleet and color work by Dorothy Rankin.

Listing of films
A full list of the travelogues released between 1931 and 1938 are as follows (with review dates by Film Daily and copyright dates when release dates are not available):

Traveltalks
Burnet Hershey is sometimes credited on these

World Adventures
Primary narrator was Leo Donnelly.

Musical World Journeys

See America First
Mostly narrated by John B. Kennedy, these United States locational travelogues were distributed in a more chronological order (based on historical periods) after their initial releases. The first three were shown in Washington D.C. at a special screening.

Our Own U.S.

Colortour Adventures
Filmed in “Naturalcolor” and Cinecolor

See also
List of short subjects by Hollywood studio#Warner Brothers
Travelogue (films)
Vitaphone Color Parade
Burton Holmes

Notes

References
 Liebman, Roy Vitaphone Films – A Catalogue of the Features and Shorts 2003 McFarland & Company
 Motion Pictures 1912-1939 Catalog of Copyright Entries 1951 Library of Congress
BoxOffice back issue scans (reliable for release dates and some plot descriptions)

External links
E.M. Newman on the IMDb.com
Film Daily links (individual reviews referenced above)

Vitaphone short films
Documentary film series